Heaven Is an Orgasm is a compilation album from the Belgian electronic band Lords of Acid.  It consists of B-sides, outtakes and unreleased material and was originally available exclusively through Lords of Acid's website.  The initial pressing of 500 copies sold out quickly, and because of popular demand for the album, it was given a wider release in 1998 by Antler-Subway Records.  The re-issue of Heaven Is an Orgasm contained new cover art.

Although named similarly, "She and Mr. Jones", and "She and Mrs. Jones" are different songs. While they have the same music, and similar chorus, the lyrics are in fact different. "She and Mrs. Jones" originally appeared on the album Voodoo-U.

Track listing

References

Lords of Acid albums
1998 compilation albums